Plesch is a surname. Notable people with the surname include:

Árpád Plesch (1889–1974), Hungarian financier, banker, and lawyer
Etti Plesch (1914–2003), Austro-Hungarian countess, huntress, racehorse owner and socialite
János Plesch (1878–1957), Hungarian academic pathologist, physiologist, and physician